Thomas Lawson McCall (March 22, 1913 January 8, 1983) was an American statesman, politician and journalist in the state of Oregon. A Republican, he was the state's thirtieth governor from 1967 to 1975. A native of Massachusetts, McCall grew up there and in central Oregon and attended the University of Oregon in Eugene. After college, he worked as a journalist, including time at The Oregonian in Portland during 

Later he worked in radio and then in television as a newscaster and political commentator. He made an unsuccessful bid for Congress in 1954, losing in the general election to Edith Green. While working for TV station KGW, he produced a documentary on pollution in Oregon, which helped to spur environmental cleanup of the air and the Willamette River. In 1964, McCall won his first political office, Oregon Secretary of State, followed by two terms as governor, where he worked towards environmental cleanup, the bottle bill, and public ownership of beaches on the coast among others. Tom McCall Waterfront Park in Portland is one of several items named in his honor.

Early life 
Born in Scituate, Massachusetts, McCall was the grandson of copper-king Thomas Lawson and Massachusetts governor and congressman Samuel W. McCall. As a child, he divided his time between Thomas Lawson's Massachusetts estate named Dreamwold and his father's ranch near Prineville, Oregon named Westernwold.

Upon graduation from Redmond High School, McCall enrolled at the University of Oregon in Eugene. Due to his family's growing financial problems he was forced to sit out long periods and took five years to earn his degree in journalism.

Journalism career
After graduating in 1936, McCall worked as a summer replacement at The Bend Bulletin newspaper. He then moved northeast to the Palouse of north central Idaho in February 1937, to the university town of Moscow. He wrote for the News-Review, and following a merger, the Daily Idahonian.

After five years in Moscow, he was encouraged to leave in March 1942; upheaval in the UI athletic department the previous year (firing of football head coach Ted Bank (also athletic director) and basketball head coach Forrest Twogood) brought continuing negative criticism by McCall and his boss thought that he should advance his career elsewhere. He traveled back to Oregon to look for work in Portland, whose economy was booming due to World War II. McCall was told by the military that he was not eligible for enlistment (due to bad knees and a recurring hernia) and journalists, still primarily men, were in short supply. He was quickly offered a job at The Oregonian at nearly triple his wages 

McCall later put his career on hold for military service in the U.S. Navy, where he served as a battle correspondent aboard the cruiser  in the Pacific Theater.

While working on a story, an official of radio station KGW (owned by The Oregonian) approached McCall about reading a public service announcement over the air. The station management was impressed by his unique voice and offered him a job as a news announcer. He worked at KGW radio until 1949, when he became administrative assistant to Oregon Gov. Douglas McKay. In 1952 McCall returned to KGW radio, where he served as a newscaster and political commentator until 1955, when he jumped from radio to television and KGW to KPTV.

McCall was a newscaster and commentator at KPTV, Oregon's first TV station, for about a year and a half. In November 1956 he followed colleague Ivan Smith out the door during a dispute with station management over placement of a sponsor's product on the news set. Just one month later, KGW-TV went on the air, with McCall and Smith as part of a durable news team that stayed together for seven years, until McCall's 1964 departure to run for Secretary of State.

Tom McCall led early efforts to help migrant workers. In September 1958 he led a meeting in Portland as chairman of the Steering Committee for the Oregon Committee on Migrant Affairs. This eventually led to groundbreaking migrant civil rights legislation passed by the Oregon Legislature in 1959.

In November 1962, McCall produced and hosted an ambitious KGW-TV documentary which graphically portrayed the poor condition of the Willamette River and air quality throughout Oregon. The award-winning documentary Pollution in Paradise helped focus public attention on the problem. KGW repeated the program in January 1963 on the eve of the opening of the legislative session, and the 1963 Legislature was spurred to some of Oregon's early attempts at combating pollution. McCall also hosted a show on KGW called Viewpoint, which dealt with political issues of the day. McCall appears briefly (on a TV set) in the 1975 film One Flew Over the Cuckoo's Nest in a cameo role as a late-night newscaster, based on his experience at KGW.

Political career 

McCall made his first run for office in 1954, winning the Republican nomination for Oregon's third district seat over eight-term incumbent Homer D. Angell. He lost in the general election to Edith Green, who went on to hold the seat for the next ten terms.

In 1958, when Mark Hatfield was elected governor of Oregon, he vacated the position of Secretary of State. In his autobiography, McCall said he thought Hatfield had promised to appoint him to the unexpired portion of the term, but the job went to Hatfield associate Howell Appling instead. When Appling chose not to run for re-election in 1964, McCall sought and won the job.

McCall ran for governor in 1966, defeating the Democratic nominee, state Treasurer Robert W. Straub. McCall won a second term in 1970, again defeating Straub.

McCall's eight years as governor were notable for many achievements in the environmental sphere, including the country's first "bottle bill", the cleanup of the Willamette River, passage of a law to maintain former Gov. Oswald West's legacy of public ownership of the state's beaches, and the first statewide land-use planning system, which introduced the urban growth boundary around the state's cities.  These achievements have done much to create McCall's enormous legacy in the state.

McCall became nationally-known in 1971 for a comment he made in an interview with CBS News' Terry Drinkwater in January, in which he said:

McCall's fishing trip along the Snake River led to a change in the Oregon Constitution. Under the Oregon Constitution, the Senate President became acting governor when the governor was out of state. In July 1971, McCall went on a fishing trip on a portion of the Snake River that acts as border between Idaho and Oregon. When McCall's group camped for the night on the Idaho side, Oregon Senate President Johns Burns, a Democrat, became acting governor. Executive control of the state changed eight times during the trip. The incident led to voters approving a 1972 ballot measure restoring the line of succession that existed prior to 1920, with the Secretary of State assuming the office when the governor was out of state, died or resigned.

Although his popularity was at its peak, Oregon's constitution prevented McCall from seeking a third consecutive term as governor in 1974. State Senator Vic Atiyeh won the Republican nomination, but lost the general election to Straub, who McCall had endorsed in the election.

McCall returned to journalism, writing a newspaper column and serving as commentator for Portland television station KATU.

McCall sought to return to the governorship in 1978. Polls showed McCall leading the race, but Atiyeh in a close second.  Atiyeh defeated McCall in the primary and went on to beat Straub in a rematch of their 1974 race.

Vortex I 

In 1970 McCall was faced with a potential riot in Portland. In May of that year a week-long student protest at Portland State University over the Kent State shootings had ended with charges of excessive police violence. The American Legion had scheduled a convention in Portland later that summer; local antiwar groups were organizing a series of demonstrations at the same time under the name of the "People's Army Jamboree" and expected to draw up to 50,000 protesters.

After attempts to convince the People's Army Jamboree to either not carry out their plans or to move the date, McCall decided to hold a rock festival at Milo McIver State Park near Estacada, Oregon called "Vortex I: A Biodegradable Festival of Life," in imitation of the famous Woodstock Festival held the previous year.

"I think I just committed political suicide," McCall is reported to have remarked immediately after approving the event. Vortex was the first and so far only state-sponsored rock festival in U.S. history.

The festival, nicknamed "The Governor's Pot Party" by Oregonians, was a success, attracting between 50,000 and 100,000 people. Gold, The Portland Zoo, Osceola, Fox, and Chrome Cyrcus were among the bands that played. The media announced that Santana, Jefferson Airplane, and the Grateful Dead were on the way, but none of them appeared. The feared violent clash between the antiwar groups and the conservative American Legion was avoided, and the city of Portland passed the summer relatively uneventfully. McCall was re-elected in November, with 56% of the vote.

Later life and death

After McCall's final attempt at the governorship a group launched an initiative to repeal McCall's most lasting legacy, the state's land use planning system, which included urban growth boundaries. Measure 6 went on the ballot for the 1982 election and McCall vowed to fight it to the end. McCall was dying of cancer and used the final months of his life making sure that Measure 6 did not pass.

During his campaign against Measure 6 McCall said, "You all know I have terminal cancer—and I have a lot of it. But what you may not know is that stress induces its spread and induces its activity. Stress may even bring it on. Yet stress is the fuel of the activist. This activist loves Oregon more than he loves life. I know I can't have both very long. The trade-offs are all right with me. But if the legacy we helped give Oregon and which made it twinkle from afar—if it goes, then I guess I wouldn't want to live in Oregon anyhow."

Measure 6 failed to pass in the 1982 election. McCall was admitted to Good Samaritan Hospital in Portland just over a month after the election.  McCall once said about death, "You're terminal from the minute you arrive. You've been going to go ever since you got here. Still it is unacceptable when the calendar hints that the prospect has lost its open-endedness. Despair strikes you and what was vaguely inevitable is barely down the road anymore."

McCall died of prostate cancer at age 69 at Good Samaritan Hospital in Portland on

Legacy

In 1968, Governor McCall created the Harbor Drive Task Force to come up with proposals to replace the riverfront highway with a public space.  The 37-acre (150,000 m2) Waterfront Park was built in 1974, running along the Willamette River for the length of downtown Portland. McCall was honored after his death when the park was renamed Tom McCall Waterfront Park in 1984.

McCall was a leading figure in passing the Oregon Beach Bill to declare Oregon shores public land in 1967.

In 1969, McCall played a major role in the founding of SOLV, an environmental non-profit organization whose goal is to "build community through volunteer action to preserve this treasure called Oregon."

The Tom McCall Forum, which pairs prominent speakers with opposing political viewpoints, is presented annually by Pacific University.

The Nature Conservancy named a nature preserve in Wasco County, Oregon after McCall.

Oregon schools that have been named for him include: Tom McCall East Upper Elementary School in Forest Grove and Tom McCall Elementary School in Redmond.

In 1998 McCall was inducted into the Hall of Achievement at University of Oregon's School of Journalism.

On October 10, 2006, the Salem Statesman Journal announced plans by a "committee of citizens" to fund and place the life-size bronze statue of the late governor pictured above in Salem's Riverfront Park.

On March 30, 2015, Oregon Governor Kate Brown, a Democrat,  signed SB333, which "designates March 22 of each year as Tom McCall Day to commemorate Governor McCall and encourage school districts to educate children about Governor McCall's legacy." The measure took effect January 1, 2016.

Marriage
While both were working in Moscow in February 1939, McCall met Audrey Owen of Spokane, and they married three months later on May 20, 1939. They had two sons: Samuel Walker McCall III, who died at age 40 in 1990, and Thomas "Tad" McCall, an environmental consultant. Audrey died in 2007 at age 92.

See also 
 Land use in Oregon
 1000 Friends of Oregon, an organization established in 1975 by McCall

References

External links

 Gubernatorial history and biography of McCall, from the Oregon Historical Society website
 Oregon Secretary of State: Governor Tom McCall
 Thomas William Lawson McCall (1913-1983)
 Tom McCall Preserve at Rowena, named in his honor, from the Nature Conservancy website
, from the 1000 Friends of Oregon website
 Tom McCall Chapter of the Association of Northwest Steelheaders
 Tom McCall Documentary produced by

Oregon Public Broadcasting

1913 births
1983 deaths
Deaths from prostate cancer
Republican Party governors of Oregon
People from Scituate, Massachusetts
Secretaries of State of Oregon
Radio personalities from Oregon
Deaths from cancer in Oregon
People from Prineville, Oregon
Journalists from Oregon
University of Oregon alumni
20th-century American writers
20th-century American politicians
American environmentalists
United States Navy personnel of World War II
American war correspondents of World War II
20th-century American journalists
American male journalists